Allison is an unincorporated community in Bryan County, Oklahoma, United States. It is located seven miles south of Durant, and had a post office from March 6, 1901, to December 15, 1921. Allison was named after the nearby Mount Allison school.

References

Unincorporated communities in Bryan County, Oklahoma
Unincorporated communities in Oklahoma